A textile museum is a museum with exhibits relating to the history and art of textiles, including:

 Textile industries and manufacturing, often located in former factories or buildings involved in the design and production of yarn, cloth and clothing
 Agriculture and farming related to textile materials such as silk, cotton and wool
 Functional use of textiles such as for clothing and bedding
 Textiles used in decorative arts, such as for fashion, carpets, tapestries, embroidery, lace and quilts

Asia
 National Textile Museum in Kuala Lumpur, Malaysia
 Textile Museum Sarawak
 Textile Museum (Jakarta)
 Kurdish Textile Museum
 Chojun Textile & Quilt Art Museum
 Bhutan Textile Museum

Canada
 Textile Museum of Canada

Europe
 Quilt Museum and Gallery
 Textile Museum of Borås
 Textile Museum and Documentation Centre
 Central Museum of Textiles, Łódź
 Fashion and Textile Museum
 Helmshore Mills Textile Museum (closed)
 Museum of Textile in Česká Skalice
 Museum of Textiles and Industry of Busto Arsizio
 Prato textile museum
 Quarry Bank Mill in Manchester, the United Kingdom

United States
 American Textile History Museum
 Brigham City Museum of Art & History
 Great Lakes Quilt Center
 International Quilt Museum
 Marie Webster House
 National Quilt Museum
 New England Quilt Museum
 San Jose Museum of Quilts & Textiles
 Southeastern Quilt & Textile Museum
 Textile Museum (Washington, D.C.)
 Windham Textile and History Museum

See also
 :Category:Textile museums
 Fashion museum
 :Category:Fashion museums

References

 
Types of museums